Edwin Redslob (22 September 1884, Weimar – 24 January 1973, West Berlin) was a German art historian who served as Reichskunstwart under the Weimar Republic. Appointed in 1920, he was the only person to fulfil this role as the position was abolished following the Nazi seizure of power in 1933.

In 1912, he was appointed to run the Angermuseum in Erfurt where he remained until 1919.

In 1945, he co-founded the Berlin daily newspaper Der Tagesspiegel, and then in 1948, he was one of the co-initiators in the founding of the Freie Universität Berlin. He was a professor at the university teaching Art History from 1948 to 1954. He was also rector from 1949 to 1950.

References

External links

1884 births
1973 deaths
People from Weimar
German art historians
Academic staff of the Free University of Berlin
Der Tagesspiegel people